Pierella lucia, the Lucia pierella, is a species of butterfly of the family Nymphalidae. It is found in Peru and Ecuador.

References

Butterflies described in 1885
Haeterini
Nymphalidae of South America
Taxa named by Gustav Weymer